Ban Dung is a district (amphoe) in northeastern Udon Thani province, Isan, Thailand.

Geography
Neighbouring districts are (from the south clockwise) Thung Fon, Phibun Rak, Phen, and Sang Khom of Udon Thani province, Phon Phisai and Fao Rai of Nong Khai province, and Ban Muang, Charoen Sin, and Sawang Daen Din of Sakon Nakhon province.

North of Ban Dung are marshlands and open water called Nong Pla Tao.

The major river is the Songkhram, which marks the boundary of the district to the east.

History
The minor district (king amphoe) Ban Dung was established on 16 May 1959, when three sub-districts were split off from Nong Han district. It was upgraded to a full district on 16 July 1963.

Administration

Central administration 
Ban Dung is divided into 13 sub-districts (tambons), which are further divided into 159 administrative villages (mubans).

Local administration 
There is one town (thesaban mueang) in the district:
 Ban Dung consisting of sub-district Si Suttho and parts of sub-district Ban Dung. The town is divided into 34 communities (chumchon).

There are 12 sub-district administrative organizations (SAO) in the district:
 Ban Dung consisting of parts of sub-district Ban Dung.
 Dong Yen consisting of sub-district Dong Yen.
 Phon Sung consisting of sub-district Phon Sung.
 Om Ko consisting of sub-district Om Ko.
 Ban Chan consisting of sub-district Ban Chan.
 Ban Chai consisting of sub-district Ban Chai.
 Na Mai consisting of sub-district Na Mai.
 Thon Na Lap consisting of sub-district Thon Na Lap.
 Wang Thong consisting of sub-district Wang Thong.
 Ban Muang consisting of sub-district Ban Muang.
 Ban Tat consisting of sub-district Ban Tat.
 Na Kham consisting of sub-district Na Kham.

Economy
The district is the site of a Voice of America (VOA) relay station, built in 1994. The Voice of America will give the station to Thailand, but will be allowed to operate it under a 25-year renewable lease expiring in 2019. Each of the station's seven shortwave transmitters is capable of broadcasting 500 kilowatts of power, covering 40 percent of the earth's surface. One of the transmitters will be dedicated for use by Radio Thailand. It will have sufficient power to reach the Middle East and the West Coast of the United States, both areas with large expatriate Thai communities.

The VOA installation has been suspected of being a CIA black site used to interrogate alleged terrorists. That suspicion has been supplanted by a BBC report that the Udon Royal Air Force Base was the home of a CIA black site, known to insiders as "Cat's Eye", but better known as "Detention Site Green", used to interrogate Abu Zubaydah, a 31-year-old Saudi-born Palestinian, believed to be one of Osama Bin Laden's top lieutenants.  In December 2014 the United States Senate Select Committee on Intelligence (SSCI) published an executive summary of a secret 6,000-page report on CIA techniques. The report alleges that at least eight Thai senior officials knew of the secret site. The site was closed in December 2002. Thailand has denied the existence of the site while the US government has neither confirmed or denied its existence.

Transport
The town is adjacent to the intersection of Highway 2022 and Highway 2096.
Local town transport is provided by Isan tuk-tuk style Samlor motor tricycle taxis.

The nearest railway stations are in Nong Khai (83 km) and Udon Thani (81 km) and the nearest full-service airport is Udon Thani International Airport at 88 km.

References

External links

amphoe.com
www.bandunglife.net

Ban Dung